Rambali is a surname. Notable people with the surname include: 

Gustave Rudman Rambali, Franco-Swedish composer, arranger and producer
Paul Rambali, British rock critic and writer